After Dark is a thriller play by the British writer Joseph Jefferson Farjeon.

After premiering at the Pier Theatre in Eastbourne it transferred to the West End for a run of 56 performance, initially at the Garrick Theatre before moving to the Comedy Theatre. The original cast included Horace Hodges, Donald Calthrop and Malcolm Keen.

Adaptation
In 1932 it was adapted into the British film After Dark directed by Albert Parker and made at Walton Studios by the British subsidiary of Fox Film.

References

Bibliography
 Goble, Alan. The Complete Index to Literary Sources in Film. Walter de Gruyter, 1999.
 Wearing, J. P. The London Stage 1920-1929: A Calendar of Productions, Performers, and Personnel. Rowman & Littlefield, 2014.

1926 plays
Plays set in England
British plays adapted into films
Plays by Joseph Jefferson Farjeon
West End plays